Ngalangi (also known as Galangue) was one of the traditional independent Ovimbundu kingdoms in Angola.

References

Ovimbundu kingdoms